The 2007 FIS Freestyle World Ski Championships were held in Madonna di Campiglio, Italy, from March 5th-11th. Five events were supposed to be held for each sex, but the half-pipe was canceled.

Results

Men's results

Skicross

Moguls

Dual moguls

Aerials

Women's results

Skicross

Moguls

Dual moguls

Aerials

External links
 Official Website
 Results from the FIS

2007
2007 in freestyle skiing
2007 in Italian sport
History of Trentino
Sport in Trentino
Freestyle skiing competitions in Italy